The Kalodziščy TV Mast is a 350-metre tall guyed TV mast situated at Kalodziščy, east of Minsk in Belarus.  It is among the tallest towers in Belarus.

History 

The mast was built in 1970, replacing an existing medium wave broadcasting station that had been built before World War II. In recent years, the number of transmitters using the Kalodziščy TV Mast has grown.

As a replacement and/or supplement, plans for a 425-metre TV tower at Minsk were developed. These plans were canceled for financial reasons.

Transmitted programmes

Radio

TV

External links 
 
 

Towers in Belarus
Communications in Belarus
Radio masts and towers in Europe
Towers completed in 1970